Charles MacKay (born May 1950, Albuquerque, New Mexico) is an American arts administrator, known for leadership roles at the Santa Fe Opera, Opera Theatre of Saint Louis, and Spoleto Festival USA/Festival of Two Worlds. He is the son of John and Margaret MacKay and an alumnus of Santa Fe High School and of the University of Minnesota.

Early experience at The Santa Fe Opera
MacKay, a French horn player, joined the orchestra of the Santa Fe Opera (SFO) at age 17.  He was a volunteer with Santa Fe Opera at age 15, and began to work in administrative capacities with SFO at age 18.  He worked at SFO as an orchestra librarian, in the business office and painting stage scenery.  Subsequently, with SFO, MacKay also held several administrative positions, including box office manager, assistant orchestra manager and business manager, the last position for 4 years.

Spoleto Festival
After leaving Santa Fe, his other administrative positions include a 6-year tenure as director of finance and administration for the Spoleto Festival USA, from 1978 to 1984.  For 5 years, he was the manager for the American artists at the Festival of Two Worlds in Spoleto, Italy.

Opera Theatre of Saint Louis
In 1984, MacKay became executive director of Opera Theatre of Saint Louis (OTSL), recruited to the post by OTSL's first general director Richard Gaddes.  In 1985, MacKay was named OTSL's second general director.  During his tenure, MacKay presided over the growth of OTSL's endowment from US$682,000 to $18 million, and maintained the company's record of never posting a deficit.  He also raised funds for the construction of the Sally S. Levy Opera Center, the company's first permanent administrative facility, which was completed in 2006.

Return to The Santa Fe Opera
In November 2007, SFO named MacKay as its third general director, succeeding Richard Gaddes and John Crosby.  He concluded his OTSL tenure on 30 September 2008, and began his tenure as SFO general director on 1 October of that year.  His immediate challenges were financial, in the wake of the 2008 financial crisis.

In 2010 and subsequent seasons, MacKay has brought several significant works to Santa Fe which had never been performed there.  They included The Tales of Hoffmann (2010), Faust (2011), and in 2012 alone, The Pearl Fishers, Rossini's Maometto II (in a new critical edition) and Karol Szymanowski's King Roger. In 2013, Rossini's La donna del lago received its Santa Fe premiere in a co-production with the Metropolitan Opera.  The 2014 season saw the first Santa Fe production of Beethoven's Fidelio.  Additionally, MacKay's tenure has been characterized by working in collaboration with several opera companies across the United States on co-productions, some of which have been US or world premieres of new operas. In addition to the Met, these companies have included Minnesota Opera (Strauss' Arabella in 2012) and Opera Philadelphia (the Morrison / Cox Oscar in 2013). SFO presented five world premieres during MacKay's tenure, including Cold Mountain (opera) by Jennifer Higdon (2015) and The (R)evolution of Steve Jobs by Mason Bates (2018).

MacKay was responsible for the recruitment first of Frédéric Chaslin, and later Harry Bicket, to the post chief conductor of the company.  In August 2017, Santa Fe Opera announced MacKay's intention to step down as its general director after the 2018 season. In October 2018, Robert K. Meya began his tenure as general director of the company.

Other achievements
MacKay is a 1997 recipient of the Arts Management Career Service Award.  He has served as chairman of the board of Opera America since 2004, and concluded his tenure in that post in June 2008. In 2018, he was awarded an honorary degree (Doctor of Music) from Indiana University.

References
Notes

External links
 J.A. Van Sant, " 'Polish' Not Change for Santa Fe Opera". Opera Today blog entry, 27 December 2007.

1950 births
Opera managers
Living people
People from Santa Fe, New Mexico